Mirahor is a village in Mut district of Mersin Province, Turkey. Mirahor was the chief stable man in the Ottoman Empire and the name of the village probably refers to the grazing land around the village which was once used by the mirahor. Population of Mirahor  was 352 as of 2012.

References

Villages in Mut District